Six ships of the French Navy have borne the name D'Entrecasteaux in honour of Antoine Bruni d'Entrecasteaux:

Ships 
 , a second-class aviso.
  (1899), a first-class protected cruiser.
 , a hired ship of the FNFL.
  (1971), an oceographic survey ship.
 , the lead ship of the Bâtiment multi-mission class.

Notes and references

Notes

References

Bibliography 
 
 

French Navy ship names